Wah Do is one of the 18 constituencies in the North District of Hong Kong which was first created in 2003.

The constituency loosely covers King Shing Court, Flora Plaza and Wah Sum Estate in Fanling with an estimated population of 18,412.

Councillors represented

Election results

2010s

2000s

References

Constituencies of Hong Kong
Constituencies of North District Council
2003 establishments in Hong Kong
Constituencies established in 2003
Fanling